Saiful Islam is a Bangladesh Awami League politician and the former Member of Parliament of Rajshahi-15.

Career
Islam was elected to parliament from Rajshahi-15 as an Awami League candidate in 1973.

Death
Islam died on 10 May 2020 at Rajshahi Medical College Hospital.

References

Awami League politicians
2020 deaths
1st Jatiya Sangsad members